Lucius Nonius Asprenas was a Roman Senator active during the Principate. He was notorious for being prosecuted for poisoning a number of people at a dinner party.

Biography
The son of Lucius Nonius Asprenas, the suffect consul of 36 BC, Asprenas was a member of the nobiles and an intimate friend of the emperor Augustus.

In around 9 BC, Nonius Asprenas was brought to trial after a number of his guests (reportedly some 130 people) died after attending a party which he hosted. Cassius Severus brought the charges against him, alleging that Asprenas had poisoned them. His defence was conducted by Gaius Asinius Pollio. Augustus expressed his concern over the charges in the Senate and made an appearance at court, but did not make any statement while present. Nevertheless, the emperor's auctoritas was sufficient to win an acquittal for Asprenas. 

That charges had been brought against him was enough to ruin his political career; not only did he forfeit his seat as one of the Septemviri epulonum, but he also was prevented from contesting the consulship.

Marriage and children
Nonius Asprenas married Quinctilla, a sister of Publius Quinctilius Varus. They had at least two sons. The first was Lucius Nonius Asprenas, the suffect consul of AD 6. The other was Sextus Nonius Quinctilianus, consul of AD 8, who might have been a biological son of Varus and his wife Vipsania.

References

Sources
 
 
 Levick, Barbara, Tiberius the Politician (1999)

1st-century BC Romans
1st-century Romans
Epulones of the Roman Empire
Asprenas, Lucius
Senators of the Roman Empire
Year of birth unknown
Year of death unknown